The Ford Transcontinental is a heavy goods vehicle tractor and rigid unit that was manufactured between 1975 and 1984 by Ford Europe in the Netherlands and Britain. A total of 8735 units were produced, 8231 in Amsterdam and another 504 at the Foden VAP in Sandbach, Cheshire UK.

Assembled almost entirely from bought in OEM component parts (e.g., cab shell from Berliet, engine from Cummins, transmission from Eaton) it was introduced to fill a perceived gap in the market in anticipation of the relaxation of weight restrictions on HGVs, and as such had a very strong chassis and heavy duty suspension. The Berliet KB 2400 cab was also used by Renault for their R-series.

Recognizable by its high cab, it was an extremely advanced vehicle for its time offering a high standard of driver comfort and a high power output for its time, courtesy of the well proven 14 litre Cummins engine with typical outputs of 290-350 HP. The engines were originally of the Cummins NTC generation, but were gradually updated to the new "big-cam" (NTE) generation - a process completed by 1979. Also, the Ford Transcontinental is noted for having oil and water meters on the dashboard, another example of the unit being ahead of its time.

Sales did not live up to expectations, mainly because the tractor unit with its heavy duty construction was too heavy for the 32 ton weight limit in the  UK at the time, although it was a popular vehicle with drivers, particularly those who were engaged on long distance continental work. The model was updated continuously, with much work carried out to lighten the heavy chassis.

Today the Transcontinental is a particularly rare vehicle, much in favour with collectors of vintage commercials, although a few do remain in revenue earning service throughout Europe.

See also
 Ford Cargo

References

External links
 Dedicated website about Ford Transcontinental

Transcontinental
Ford trucks
Vehicles introduced in 1975
Cab over vehicles